The 2021–22 Nepal T20I Tri-Nation Series was a Twenty20 International (T20I) cricket tournament that took place in Nepal from 28 March to 4 April 2022. The participating teams were the hosts Nepal along with Malaysia and Papua New Guinea. The matches were played at the Tribhuvan University International Cricket Ground in Kirtipur. On 12 March 2022, the Cricket Association of Nepal (CAN) confirmed all the fixtures.

Before the tri-nation series, Nepal played two One Day International (ODI) matches against Papua New Guinea. Papua New Guinea won both of the matches, winning by six runs in the first ODI and three wickets in the second ODI. In the tri-nation series, Nepal became the first team to qualify for the final, after they won their first three matches. Papua New Guinea joined Nepal in the final of the tri-series, after Malaysia lost heavily to Nepal in the final round-robin match. Nepal defeated Papua New Guinea in the final by 50 runs to win the tournament with a 100% winning record. Nepal's Dipendra Singh Airee, who was named player of match in the final after an all-round display in which he scored a half-century and took 4 wickets, was also named player of the series.

ODI series

Squads

1st ODI

2nd ODI

T20I tri-nation series

Squads

Nepal added Rohit Paudel to their T20I squad on 28 March 2022.

Round-robin

Final

References

External links
 Series home at ESPN Cricinfo (ODI series)
 Series home at ESPN Cricinfo (T20I Tri-Nation series)

Associate international cricket competitions in 2021–22
Nepal T20I Tri-Nation Series
Nepal T20I Tri-Nation Series